The US AWC International Fellows Hall of Fame honors USAWC international graduates "who have attained, through military merit, the highest positions in their nation's armed forces, or who have held an equivalent position by rank or responsibility in a multinational organization." 

Commandant of USAWC DeWitt C. Smith is primarily responsible for the creation of the International Fellows Program’s (IFP) 1977. From a start with six foreign students in 1978, the program now sustains over forty International Fellows (IFs) per year. Usually, only one IF per representative country per academic year participates in the program. While the fellows program was established in 1978 and the first induction into the IF Hall of Fame took place in 1988. Inductees are awarded in person at Carlisle Barracks. Since its inception over 1,900 international fellows graduate from 130 countries have been part of the fellows program.

List of IF Hall of Fame fellows

References 

United States Army War College